Akialoa is an extinct genus of Hawaiian honeycreeper in the subfamily Carduelinae of the family Fringillidae.

The birds were endemic to Hawaii.

Species
It contains the following species:

 Lesser ʻakialoa or Hawai'i ʻakialoa, Akialoa obscura - extinct (1940)
 Greater ʻakialoa - extinct  
 Oʻahu ʻakialoa, Akialoa ellisiana  — extinct (1940, Oahu)
 Maui Nui ʻakialoa or Lanaʻi ʻakialoa, Akialoa lanaiensis — extinct (1892, Lana'i)
 Kauaʻi ʻakialoa, Akialoa stejnegeri — extinct (1969, Kauai)
 Hoopoe-billed ʻakialoa, Akialoa upupirostris — extinct Late Quaternary (prehistoric) (Kaua'i, Oahu)
 Akialoa sp. - extinct Late Quaternary (prehistoric) (Maui)
 Giant ʻakialoa, Akialoa sp. — extinct Late Quaternary (prehistoric)

See also
 Asteroid 378002 ʻAkialoa 
 
 

 
Hawaiian honeycreepers
Extinct birds of Hawaii
Holocene extinctions
Bird genera
Carduelinae
Higher-level bird taxa restricted to the Australasia-Pacific region
Bird extinctions since 1500